Bajaj Platina is a 100cc motorcycle manufactured by Bajaj Auto. The Platina was launched in April 2006 at an ex-showroom price of Rs 35,000 and crossed sales of 500,000 units within eight months of its launch. A 125 DTS-Si variant with the same engine as the XCD was introduced in September 2007 with sales of more than 30,000 units per month but subsequently discontinued.

Design and styling
The Platina's design is the same as Bajaj Kawasaki Wind 125, which was launched in late 2003. It is much more relaxed and upright than its rivals in the 100 cc segment. Bajaj Platina's front end might feel lighter when a pillion is on the bike. A new model of the same bike was recently launched named Bajaj Platina ES Comfortec.

Comfort and handling
The bike has a plush ride without sacrificing handling. It has an upright riding posture inline with other commuter bikes.

Performance and fuel economy
The engine of Platina is from another 100 cc bike from Bajaj, the Bajaj CT 100 but with a new Bajaj technology, ExhausTec. It has one of the best 100cc engines which is very frugal and feels less stressed on high speeds than other bikes in the segment.  The bike is capable of a top speed of around 91 km/h and does 0–60 km/h in 7.89 seconds. In city traffic, the bike returns 72 kmpl, while on the highway it returns more than 80 kmpl if ridden at economy speeds.

Awards
The 100 cc Platina won the 2007 NDTV Profit Bike India-100 cc bike of the year award.

References

External links
Bajaj Platina Review
Bajaj Platina 100
Bajaj Platina 110
Bajaj Platina 110ES

Platina
Motorcycles introduced in 2006